The 2015–16 Saudi Crown Prince Cup was the 41st season of the Saudi Crown Prince Cup since its establishment in 1957. This season's competition featured a total of 30 teams, 14 teams from the Pro League, and 16 teams from the First Division.

The holders were Al-Ahli who beat Al-Hilal 2–1 in the previous season's final on 13 February 2015. 

The 2016 Saudi Crown Prince Cup Final was played between Al-Ahli and Al-Hilal at the King Fahd International Stadium in Riyadh. In a rematch of the previous year's final, Al-Hilal defeated holders Al-Ahli 2–1 in the final to win their record-extending 13th Crown Prince Cup title.

Participating teams

Pro League

First Division

First stage

Preliminary round
The Preliminary round fixtures were played on 15, 16, 17 & 24 August 2015. All times are local, AST (UTC+3).

Second stage

Bracket

Note:     H: Home team,   A: Away team

Round of 16
The Round of 16 fixtures were played on 11 & 12 September 2015. The Al-Taawoun v Al-Hilal match was delayed to 30 November 2015 due to Al-Hilal's participation in the quarter-finals of the 2015 AFC Champions League. All times are local, AST (UTC+3).

Quarter-finals
The Quarter-finals fixtures were played on 22 & 23 October 2015. The Al-Hilal v Al-Qadisiyah match was delayed due to Al-Hilal's participation in the semi-finals of the 2015 AFC Champions League. All times are local, AST (UTC+3).

Semi-finals
The Semi-finals fixtures were played on 31 December 2015 and 1 January 2016. All times are local, AST (UTC+3).

Final

The final was held on 19 February 2016 in the King Fahd International Stadium in Riyadh. All times are local, AST (UTC+3).

Winner

Top goalscorers
As of 19 February 2016

References

Saudi Crown Prince Cup seasons
2015–16 domestic association football cups
Crown Prince Cup